DeTour Village is a village in Chippewa County in the U.S. state of Michigan.  The population was 325 at the 2010 census.

The village is at the extreme eastern tip of the Upper Peninsula of Michigan, in Detour Township, at the turning point for the shipping channel connecting the St. Mary's River with Lake Huron and the Straits of Mackinac. Drummond Island, one of the largest islands in the St. Mary's River, is only one mile across the river from DeTour.  The DeTour Reef Light is nearby.

History
The place was originally an Ojibwe settlement.  It was connected with the fur trade and over time it came to have a large Metis population.  Over time the Metis inhabitants were redefined as being French-Canadian.

The area was organized in 1850 as Warren Township, named after Ebenezer Warren, the first postmaster of the township. The settlement was called Warrenville on an 1848 map. The name was changed to Detour in 1856 when a new postmaster, Henry A. Williams, assumed office. It incorporated as a village in 1899.  The spelling was changed to "DeTour" in 1953 and the post office was renamed "DeTour Village" in 1961.

M-134 runs through the  village, connecting with I-75  to the west and with M-129  to the west, which runs north  to Sault Ste. Marie.  M-134 also continues east to Drummond Island via the Drummond Island Ferry.

Geography

Climate

Major highways

Demographics

As of 2000 the median income for a household in the village was $31,250, and the median income for a family was $45,104. Males had a median income of $27,188 versus $33,125 for females. The per capita income for the village was $19,967.  About 6.5% of families and 10.4% of the population were below the poverty line, including 32.6% of those under age 18 and 5.7% of those age 65 or over.

2010 census
As of the census of 2010, there were 325 people, 166 households, and 96 families residing in the village. The racial makeup of the village was 82.8% White, 12.9% Native American, and 4.3% from two or more races. Hispanic or Latino of any race were 0.6% of the population.

There were 166 households, of which 16.3% had children under the age of 18 living with them, 52.4% were married couples living together, 1.8% had a female householder with no husband present, 3.6% had a male householder with no wife present, and 42.2% were non-families. 38.6% of all households were made up of individuals, and 20.5% had someone living alone who was 65 years of age or older. The average household size was 1.96 and the average family size was 2.56.

The median age in the village was 57.6 years. 15.4% of residents were under the age of 18; 2.8% were between the ages of 18 and 24; 15.4% were from 25 to 44; 28.3% were from 45 to 64; and 38.2% were 65 years of age or older. The gender makeup of the village was 49.5% male and 50.5% female.

References

External links
DeTour Area Chamber of Commerce
DeTour Village Municipal Website

Villages in Chippewa County, Michigan
Villages in Michigan
1899 establishments in Michigan
Populated places established in 1899
Populated places on Lake Huron in the United States